Robert Gerard Tapert (born May 14, 1955) is an American film and television producer, writer and director, best known for co-creating the television series Xena: Warrior Princess.

He is also one of the founding partners of the film production companies Renaissance Pictures and Ghost House Pictures.

Personal life
Tapert has two sisters, Dorothy and Mary Beth Tapert. He also has a younger brother, Jeff Tapert. He has been married to actress Lucy Lawless since 28 March 1998; the couple has two sons. Lawless played the title character in Xena: Warrior Princess.

Film

Tapert first became involved with filmmaking while attending Michigan State University where he was studying economics. Through his friend and roommate Ivan Raimi, Tapert would meet future longstanding filmmaking partners Sam Raimi and Bruce Campbell.

Tapert and director Sam Raimi experimented on several short films before endeavoring on their first feature-length picture, a graphic horror film titled The Evil Dead, which Tapert produced, Raimi directed, and Bruce Campbell starred. It was a success with the crowd at the Cannes Film Festival in France, and a glowing review from horror author Stephen King saw the film given a cinematic release in the USA, and later internationally.

Although not a favorite of critics at the time, it gained a cult following and was later critically acclaimed as a horror classic. The film was successful enough to spawn two sequels, Evil Dead II and Army of Darkness, a remake in 2013, and a television series titled Ash vs Evil Dead.

Tapert continued on to produce numerous other films, typically involving Raimi and/or Campbell in some capacity, such as Crimewave, Easy Wheels, Darkman, Hard Target, Timecop, The Quick and the Dead, A Simple Plan, and The Gift.

Tapert co-founded film production company Ghost House Pictures in 2002. Their first release, The Grudge, grossed nearly $200 million internationally. They followed up that success with Boogeyman, Rise, The Messengers, 30 Days of Night, Drag Me to Hell which Raimi directed, The Possession, and a remake of Tobe Hooper's seminal film Poltergeist.

In 2013, Tapert and Raimi tapped Uruguayan director Fede Álvarez, after seeing his short, Ataque de pánico!, to reimagine The Evil Dead. Diablo Cody contributed a polish to help Americanize the script.

Tapert would re-collaborate with Álvarez and writer Rodo Sayagues in 2016 on the breakout film Don't Breathe that grossed $157 million worldwide.

Television
In the 1990s, Tapert produced and/or wrote several television series, including Hercules: The Legendary Journeys, M.A.N.T.I.S., Spy Game, and American Gothic. Tapert also co-created the prequel series Young Hercules that starred Ryan Gosling.

During Hercules, Tapert created the character of Xena which he later spun off into a separate series, Xena: Warrior Princess. The franchise has been referred to as ground-breaking and the character as a feminist and lesbian icon. Xena: Warrior Princess has been credited by many, including Buffy the Vampire Slayer creator Joss Whedon, with blazing the trail for a new generation of female action heroes such as Buffy, Max of Dark Angel, Sydney Bristow of Alias, and the Bride in Quentin Tarantino's Kill Bill. After serving as Lucy Lawless's stunt double on Xena, stunt woman Zoë E. Bell was recruited to be Uma Thurman's stunt double in Tarantino's Kill Bill. By helping to pave the way for female action heroes in television and film, Xena also strengthened the stunt woman profession.

In 2008, Tapert produced Legend of the Seeker, the television adaptation of the popular Sword of Truth books by Terry Goodkind for ABC Studios.

Tapert followed with the Roman epic Spartacus for Starz in 2010, including Spartacus: Blood and Sand, Spartacus: Gods of the Arena, Spartacus: Vengeance, and Spartacus: War of the Damned.

Tapert's most recent television project is Ash vs Evil Dead based on the Evil Dead film franchise that premiered on Starz in 2015.

Filmography

Film

Acting roles

Other roles

Direct-to-video 
Producer
 Battle the Big Tuna (1991) (Documentary film)
 30 Days of Night: Dark Days (2010)

Executive producer
 Darkman II: The Return of Durant (1995) 
 Darkman III: Die Darkman Die (1996) 
 Hercules and Xena – The Animated Movie: The Battle for Mount Olympus (1998) 
 Messengers 2: The Scarecrow (2009)

Television

Acting roles

Video game

Musical
Tapert produced the stage musical Pleasuredome as a love story to 1980's New York City incorporating songs from the era. The play, which was based on Tapert's personal experiences, successfully premiered in 2017 to critical acclaim and sold-out crowds in Tapert's home of Auckland, New Zealand and stars Lucy Lawless.

57,000 tickets were sold during its first 13-week run.

Further reading
Warren, Bill. The Evil Dead Companion, .

References

External links

Official Rob Tapert Site

1955 births
American film producers
Living people
Michigan State University alumni
Place of birth missing (living people)